Mary Beth Bentley (born May 30, 1969), better known by her ring name Lexie Fyfe, is an American professional wrestler. She has wrestled in various independent wrestling promotions, most notably for Shimmer Women Athletes. She is a one-time NWA World Women's Champion.  She also appeared on WWE Raw as the "fake Hillary Clinton."

Early life
Bentley was born in Denville, New Jersey where she spent most of her life, attending Morris Knolls High School. She spent a couple of years in Toledo, Ohio and St. Petersburg, Florida when she was very young.

Bentley went to Elon College in North Carolina and now resides in Tampa, Florida after a couple of years in Jeffersonville, Indiana.

Career
While working in billing at LabCorp, Bentley met co-worker Brandi Wine who asked if she had an interest in training to become a wrestler. Brandi was valeting at the time for the "Beastmaster" Rick Link and Tim Blaze. She introduced Lexie to some local promoters who were looking for female wrestlers. Ken Spence, who runs a wrestling school in Winston-Salem, North Carolina, talked her into coming early to one of the next shows. She got in the ring with a couple of the wrestlers and learned some simple moves. She started training at Ken's school right after that in April 1995.

She stayed at Spence's school for a little over a year while learning the basic techniques of wrestling. Feeling that she needed to become more versatile and learn different styles, she left Spence's school. Then she had met Matt Hardy on a show and he invited her down to their training place. In fact, she was thinking about leaving wrestling because she didn't feel that she was progressing in the ring. She learned so much there especially about the psychology of a wrestling match. Also, she had the chance to learn valuable skills from the "unpredictable" Johnny Rodz, who has trained stars including as Tazz and Perry Saturn. She visited his school at least six times on various trips to the New York area.

In 2001, Fyfe wrestled for New-Wave Championship Wrestling. She lost out to Bobcat for the vacant NWCW Women's Championship.

In 2005, Lexie joined Shimmer Women Athletes as a heel and defeated Christie Ricci on the promotion's first show. She later began teaming with Malia Hosaka after they attacked Lorelei Lee; following Lee's victory over Malia on Volume 3. On Volume 4 Hosaka and Fyfe defeated Lee and Cindy Rogers in a tag team match. On Volume 5 they became an official team under the name The Experience. Since then they had a winning streak which was broken by Cheerleader Melissa and MsChif on Volume 12. They then started another winning streak which was broken this time by Ashley and Nevaeh in the final of a six-team Gauntlet Match on Volume 21.

After missing Volume 23 The Experience came back as part of the Volume 24 as they defeated the team of Rayna Von Tosh and Tenille.

On April 21, 2008, Lexie worked as a Hillary Clinton imposter on WWE Raw, where she defeated "Barack Obama" before being destroyed by Umaga.

In early 2010 Fyfe took a hiatus from professional wrestling due to her pregnancy and subsequent childbirth.

When Shine Wrestling was established on July 20, 2012, Lexie began her stint as a babyface authority figure for the promotion. On October 27, 2012, Fyfe made a return appearance to SHIMMER as a villain at Volume 50; taking part in a ten-woman elimination tag team match that saw her, Mercedes Martinez, Portia Perez, Nicole Matthews, and Saraya Knight defeated by MsChif, Allison Danger, Leva Bates, and Cheerleader Melissa.

Championships and accomplishments
In Your Face Wrestling
IYFW Women's Championship (1 time)
National Wrestling Alliance
NWA World Women's Championship (1 time)
North Atlantic Championship Wrestling
NACW Women's Championship (1 time)
Professional Girl Wrestling Association
PGWA Women's Championship (1 time)
Pro Wrestling Entertainment
PWE Women's Championship (1 time)
Pro Wrestling Illustrated
Ranked No. 31 of the best 50 female singles wrestlers in the PWI Female 50 in 2008.
Southern Championship Wrestling
SCW Women's Championship (1 time)
X Jam Wrestling
XJAM Women's Championship (1 time)

References

External links

Online World of Wrestling profile

1969 births
American female professional wrestlers
Elon University alumni
Living people
People from Denville, New Jersey
Professional wrestling trainers
Professional wrestlers from New Jersey
21st-century American women
21st-century professional wrestlers
20th-century professional wrestlers
20th-century American women
NWA World Women's Champions